Crump may refer to:

Places 
 Crump, Michigan, United States
 Crump, Missouri, a community in Cape Girardeau County, Missouri, United States
 Crump, Tennessee, a city in Hardin County, Tennessee, United States
 Crump Island, off the northeast coast of Antigua
 Crump Lake (Oregon), United States

Other 
 Crump (surname)
 Crump Cup, an invitational golf tournament for amateurs
 Crump Stadium, a sports stadium in Memphis, Tennessee, built in 1934 and largely demolished in 2006
 Crump weir, a two dimensional triangular weir invented by Edwin Samuel Crump
 Crump's mouse (Diomys crumpi), a species of rodent in the family Muridae
 Shreve, Crump & Low, a Boston, Massachusetts jewelry business
 a Yu-Gi-Oh! character

See also 
 Krump, a dancing style